John Bartlett Angel  (June 12, 1913 – January 10, 1993), born in St. John's, Newfoundland, was the recipient of the Order of Canada for his work in the improvement of education and welfare in Newfoundland through his voluntary service to the province.

Angel is the fourth-generation president of the United Nail and Foundry Company Limited. Angel's mother was Mary Elizabeth Bartlett, sister of Captain Robert Bartlett. 

Angel was a member of the following northern expeditions on the Effie M. Morrissey:
1931 - Norcross-Bartlett expedition to North East Greenland,
1932 - Peary Memorial expedition to North West Greenland,
1933 - Norcross-Bartlett expedition to Foxe Basin,
1935 - Bartlett expedition to North West Greenland,

These are some of the other accomplishments and awards that Angel has received:
 Canadian Centennial Medal,
 honorary life membership, Canadian Cancer Society,
 life membership, Association of Professional Engineers of Newfoundland,
 honorary Doctor of Engineering Degree, Memorial University of Newfoundland,
 member, Order of Canada,
 gold medal award, Canadian Council of Professional Engineers.

See also
List of people of Newfoundland and Labrador

External links
Order of Canada, List of Newfoundland and Labrador Recipients

1913 births
1993 deaths
Members of the Order of Canada
People from St. John's, Newfoundland and Labrador
Dominion of Newfoundland people